Gosteče is a village on a river terrace on the right bank of the Sora River in the Municipality of Škofja Loka in the Upper Carniola region of Slovenia.

Church

The local church is dedicated to Saint Andrew. The exterior features several frescoes, including a 14th-century depiction of Saint Christopher.

References

External links 

Gosteče at Geopedia

Populated places in the Municipality of Škofja Loka